The 2016 Minnesota Golden Gophers football team represented the University of Minnesota in the 2016 NCAA Division I FBS football season. They were led by first-year head coach Tracy Claeys and played their home games at TCF Bank Stadium. They were a member of the West Division of the Big Ten Conference. They finished the season 9–4, 5–4 in conference play to finish in fourth place in the West Division. They were invited to the Holiday Bowl where they defeated Washington State.

Personnel

Staff

Schedule
Minnesota faced all six West Division opponents: Illinois, Iowa, Nebraska, Northwestern, Purdue, and Wisconsin. The Gophers also faced East Division opponents Maryland, Penn State, and Rutgers. Minnesota played three non-conference games: Oregon State of the Pac-12 Conference, Indiana State of the Missouri Valley Football Conference, and Colorado State of the Mountain West Conference. Minnesota had one bye week during the season between their games against Indiana State and Colorado State.

Game summaries

Oregon State

Indiana State

Colorado State

at Penn State

Iowa

at Maryland

Rutgers

at Illinois

Purdue

at #21 Nebraska

Northwestern

at #6 Wisconsin

Washington State–Holiday Bowl

Roster

Players drafted into the NFL

Awards and honors

References

Minnesota
Minnesota Golden Gophers football seasons
Holiday Bowl champion seasons
Minnesota Golden Gophers football